Kelton is a surname. Notable people with the surname include:

Aaron Kelton (born 1974), American college football coach. 
Allan C. Kelton (1864–1928), American officer serving in the United States Marine Corps during the Spanish–American War 
Arthur Kelton, (d.1549/1550), British author who wrote in rhyme about Welsh history
David Kelton (born 1979), former Major League Baseball player
Elmer Kelton (1926–2009), American journalist and writer
Fay Kelton, retired Australian stage, radio and television actress
Gene Kelton (1953–2010), American guitarist, harmonica player, and singer-songwriter  
John C. Kelton (1828–1893), American officer in the United States Army 
John G. Kelton, Canadian hematologist and the past Dean of the McMaster University Medical School
Kevin Kelton (born 1956), former American television writer
Mark Kelton, former American senior executive of the Central Intelligence Agency
Paige Kelton, female American investigative reporter and Special Projects Manager on Action News Jax' 
Pert Kelton, (1907–1968), American vaudeville, movie, radio and television actress.
Robert Kelton (1908–1996), American blues guitarist and banjo player
Roy Kelton Orbison (1936–1988), American singer-songwriter
Stephanie Kelton (born 1969), female American economist and Professor of Public Policy and Economics